Saygin Yalcin (Turkish: Saygın Yalçın; born 1984/1985) is a Dubai-based German entrepreneur and academic lecturer of Turkish origin. He founded sukar.com which was acquired by Souq.com, which was then acquired by Amazon for $580 million.

Personal life
Saygin was born in Bremen to Turkish immigrants. In his teen years he was a skilled footballer who played in German junior league A-Junioren Bundesliga.

Education
He studied in Germany and later in the United States and Mexico. He holds a bachelor's degree in Business Administration from Monroe College.

Career
One of his  jobs was marketing and sales for BMW in 2004. He also worked for Capgemini and L’Oreal. He first started his entrepreneurial career by founding a business in Germany. Later he moved to the United Arab Emirates, where he founded Sukar.com. After selling it to Souq.com, he later established SellAnyCar.com becoming its CEO. He is also well known on social media after appearing on YouTube He is a visiting instructor on entrepreneurship in Canadian University of Dubai. His YouTube channel produces the show Startup Hero where selected viewers pitch their idea to Yalcin and other investors for funding.

sellanycar.com 
For the expansion of sellanycar.com to Europe, he has collected about 10 million euros in an investment round from Polar Light Ventures. In another investment round, he wanted to collect 100 million euros, which would make the company a unicorn. However, the investment round was canceled. In 2015 sellanycar.com also came to Germany. The goal was to take over the market leadership of the unicorn AUTO1 Group. The operating business of sellanycar.com in Germany was discontinued after a few months.

References

Living people
Businesspeople from Bremen
German people of Turkish descent
German expatriates in the United Arab Emirates
Turkish businesspeople
1985 births